Yarramalong Bus Lines was an Australian bus operator that ran bus services in the Wyong Shire on the Central Coast of New South Wales from 1914 until it was sold to Busways in January 2008.

History
The business was founded in 1914 by Archie Palmer with a horse-drawn coach to transport passengers and groceries, newspapers and mail. Bags were carried on the roof of the coach and a return trip would cost 2 shillings. A Model-T Ford was the first motorised bus to be acquired and was followed by a Chevrolet in 1948. The bus service ran twice daily in each direction between Yarramalong and Wyong but services were sometimes cancelled because of flooding in the Yarramalong Valley.

A coach operation was established and operated under the Palmer Leisure Tours name. This was sold in January 2003 to Road Runner Tours. In January 2008 the remaining school services were sold to [|Busways]].

References

Defunct bus companies of Australia
Bus companies of New South Wales
Transport companies established in 1914
Transport companies disestablished in 2008
Transport on the Central Coast (New South Wales)
1914 establishments in Australia
2008 disestablishments in Australia